The Glasgow–Edinburgh via Carstairs line is a main railway route which connects the Scottish cities of Glasgow and Edinburgh, by means of their respective sections of the West Coast Main Line (WCML).

Along with the Shotts line, the Falkirk line, and the Helensburgh to Edinburgh route via Airdrie and Bathgate, the line is one of five direct electrified rail links between  Glasgow and Edinburgh, and is frequently used by passenger and freight traffic. Passenger services are operated by ScotRail, Avanti West Coast, CrossCountry, London North Eastern Railway and TransPennine Express with freight services operated by DB Cargo, Freightliner and Direct Rail Services.

History
This line was opened by the Caledonian Railway as part of a plan to link Glasgow and Edinburgh to the railways in England. The main line from England (now known as the West Coast Main Line) splits at Carstairs, with one branch going to Edinburgh Waverley and the other to Glasgow Central. The Glasgow–Edinburgh via Carstairs line consists of those two branches joined by a short connecting chord at Carstairs. The Edinburgh portion opened for passengers on 15 February 1848, and the Glasgow section opened for passengers on 1 November 1849.

The original Edinburgh terminus was at Lothian Road, until Princes Street opened on 2 May 1870. It closed under the Beeching cuts in 1965, when the remaining services were diverted to Edinburgh Waverley. The Glasgow terminus was initially Buchanan Street, but when Glasgow Central opened on 31 July 1879 this became the terminus, and Central has remained the Glasgow terminus ever since.

From 1849 to 1869 the Caledonian Railway provided a service from Edinburgh (Lothian Road) to Glasgow (Buchanan Street), by way of Carstairs, Coatbridge and Stepps, although this was a somewhat circuitous route compared to the rival Edinburgh and Glasgow Railway line via Falkirk High. The E&G line was already well established by this time, having opened from Glasgow Queen Street to Edinburgh Haymarket in February 1842 and been extended to Edinburgh Waverley in August 1846. The Caledonian therefore opened its direct route via Shotts in 1869, and diverted all of its Edinburgh to Glasgow services via that line. Regular services between the two cities via Carstairs did not resume for over 120 years, although the lines remained busy with services from both cities to and from England.

After the 1922 grouping, all the lines became part of the London, Midland and Scottish Railway company, and after nationalisation in 1948 they became part of British Rail.

The Carstairs to Glasgow section was electrified by British Rail in 1974 as part of the electrification of the Weaver Junction to Glasgow Central section of the WCML. The Carstairs to Edinburgh section was not electrified at that time. Many long-distance trains from the south used to split into separate Edinburgh and Glasgow portions at Carstairs, and diesel locomotives continued to operate the Carstairs to Edinburgh part of the service. This procedure added significantly to journey times, typically adding at least 20 minutes to Edinburgh schedules. Division on northbound services was relatively simple, with the electric locomotive continuing forward with the Glasgow portion of the train, while a diesel loco would be attached to the rear part and would haul the Edinburgh train in the opposite direction. However, attachment would involve the section from Edinburgh arriving into Carstairs first behind a diesel locomotive, and pointing in the Glasgow direction, with the Glasgow portion running past under electric power. The Edinburgh portion would then reverse back into the opposite platform to join the back of the Glasgow section and the fully joined up train would then head south. After WCML electrification the Edinburgh portions were typically hauled by a Haymarket locomotive fitted with Electric Train Heating, either a Class 47 or Class 40.

The Carstairs–Edinburgh line was electrified in 1991 as part of the electrification of the East Coast Main Line (ECML). When this was completed, two new services from Edinburgh to Glasgow via Carstairs were reintroduced.  Although the line via Carstairs is the longest of the various routes between Edinburgh and Glasgow, its electrification allowed the London King's Cross to Glasgow Intercity services (which had previously run to Glasgow Queen Street via the E&GR line) to be operated by InterCity 225 electric trains and diverted to Glasgow Central station. Electrification of the Queen Street route was not planned at the time, and the London services caused congestion at Queen Street where the platforms were not long enough to accommodate them. In addition, as the North Berwick Line was included in the ECML electrification and the depot for its EMU trains was Glasgow Shields Road TMD, a limited stop ScotRail service was also introduced between Edinburgh and Glasgow via Carstairs partly as a means of using what would otherwise have been empty stock movements.  Some of these services operate all the way through from Glasgow Central to North Berwick.

From 2011, changes to the franchising arrangements resulted in most of the East Coast London King's Cross to Glasgow Central services being withdrawn. Instead, some CrossCountry services from south-west England to Edinburgh via York were extended from Edinburgh to Glasgow Central in order to maintain a service from Glasgow to north-east England. Although these are operated by diesel trains they continue to operate via Carstairs rather than the more direct Shotts line, which is not maintained for high speed running.

Route 

Starting from Glasgow Central (High Level), the line follows the main spine of the WCML to Motherwell where it continues to Carstairs. South of the station, the line splits at Carstairs Junction where it joins another branch from the southern section of the WCML through a tight curve with a permanent speed restriction of 20 mph.

From Carstairs the line proceeds in a north easterly direction up the Edinburgh branch of the WCML towards Edinburgh. At  the line joins up with the Shotts line and continues towards Haymarket station in western Edinburgh.

London North Eastern Railway services and some Avanti West Coast services use the two straight through platforms at either side of the historic station, while ScotRail services not working to North Berwick terminate at the several bay platforms on the west side of the station.

Services 

The main services to use the route are East Coast, Cross Country and Scottish Regional Services. It is generally not regarded as a main commuter route between Glasgow and Edinburgh owing to its circuitous route which involves travelling 30 miles south towards Carstairs and returning north again, and the lack of available train paths since long-distance freight and express services are given priority on it.

Summer 2007
The most frequent user of the line was GNER which runs a service to and from Glasgow Central every two hours until 2000. However, due to engineering work at Edinburgh Waverley from late July until November, only one return service per day used the line. Buses replaced trains from Motherwell station, and passengers were advised to travel from Glasgow Queen Street station.

Virgin Trains West Coast operated services from both Edinburgh and Glasgow Central to London Euston via the WCML. Virgin CrossCountry operated services from Edinburgh via the ECML and Glasgow via the WCML to destinations as far as Brighton, Bournemouth and Penzance.

First ScotRail operates services to/from North Berwick on the line. Only a few services continued from Edinburgh to Glasgow Central from the coastal town. A similar service operated from Glasgow Central to North Berwick.

Winter 2007/08
The users of the line are:

 National Express East Coast (NXEC) which runs a service to and from Glasgow Central on an approximately two-hour frequency.
 Virgin Trains use the line to run services to England (to London and Birmingham).
 CrossCountry trains operate services from Glasgow to Edinburgh for destinations to the southcoast.
 First ScotRail operate services to/from North Berwick on the line. Only a few services continue from Edinburgh to Glasgow Central from the coastal town. A similar service operates from Glasgow Central to North Berwick.
 First TransPennine Express took over the Manchester to Glasgow Central and Edinburgh services from December 2008 using Class 185.

2018 
As of May 2018:
Abellio ScotRail (ScotRail since April 2022) run a service roughly every two hours between Glasgow and Edinburgh calling at Motherwell, Wishaw, Carluke, Carstairs, Haymarket and Edinburgh Waverley though 2 trains call at Kirknewton, Curriehill, Wester Hales, Kingsknowe and Slateford. All other services pass through these stations without calling but served by Shotts Line services regularly. Most of these services are extended to/from Ayr with a few also continuing beyond Edinburgh to North Berwick, These services are operated by Class 380s though Class 156s can also be seen. These services do not operate on Sundays.

CrossCountry run a two hourly service to/from Glasgow Central with these services being operated by Class 220s, Class 221s and InterCity 125s.

TransPennine Express run hourly from Manchester Airport to either Glasgow Central (1tp2h) or Edinburgh (1tp2h), alternating with Avanti West Coast services.

Rolling stock 
The route is electrified throughout using 25 kV overhead lines, and three of the passenger companies that use the route employ electric traction. Class 220 (non-tilting) and Class 221 (tilting) 'Voyager' diesel units are used on services to the Midlands and western and southern England.

 London North Eastern Railway use Class 800s and 801s on its trains to and from Glasgow Central.
 ScotRail use Class 380s, 156 and 158s on the line, on Glasgow to/from North Berwick and Edinburgh- Glasgow services.
 Avanti West Coast use Class 390 Pendolino EMUs and Class 221 Super Voyager DEMUs on its Edinburgh / Glasgow to London Euston services.
 CrossCountry use Class 220 Voyager, Class 221 Super Voyager DEMUs and InterCity 125s on its services that continue from Edinburgh Waverley to Glasgow Central.

'Thunderbird' locomotive 
Carstairs station was also the home of one of Virgin's special 'Thunderbird' Class 57 locomotives named after the Thunderbirds animation series and locomotives use characters from the series as their names. 'Thunderbirds' were used to haul broken down services for Virgin and are compatible with both the Pendolino and Voyager fleets. As of 2019, Virgin no longer run the franchise.

References

Sources
 
 

Railway lines in Scotland
Standard gauge railways in Scotland
Railway lines opened in 1848